Jaynie Seal (born 18 May 1973) is an Australian television presenter.

Seal is currently a weather presenter on Sky News Weather Channel, news presenter on Saturday Edition and Sunday Edition on Sky News Live and advertorial presenter on Today Extra.

Career
Seal was part of the original team for the Weather Channel when it launched in 1999 and she found a passion for weather and live television.

In 2004, Seal joined the Nine Network as weather presenter for National Nine News in Sydney along with Nine Morning News and Nine Afternoon News; she remained in this position for 7 years. Seal has also worked on The Footy Show, Fresh, Today, Abbamania, Hole in the Wall and Kerri-Anne where she also co-hosted for a week.

In late 2012, she rejoined Sky News Weather Channel as a weather presenter while also remaining with the Nine Network as an advertorial presenter on Today Extra.

In 2016, Seal added a role as news presenter on Sky News Live weekend morning programs Saturday Edition and Sunday Edition.

Coinciding with the launch of Sky News on WIN in September 2018, Seal was announced as the inaugural presenter of breakfast news program Headline News.

Personal life
Seal is the mother of two boys and lives in Sydney.

She was also in a long-term relationship with television and radio presenter Ed Phillips until they separated in 2012.

References

External links

 Nine News team: Jaynie Seal

1973 births
Australian people of Jewish descent
Australian reporters and correspondents
Australian television presenters
Nine News presenters
Living people
Sky News Australia reporters and presenters